Woltersdorf is a municipality in the district Lüchow-Dannenberg, in Lower Saxony, Germany.

The municipality Woltersdorf includes the villages Woltersdorf, Klein Breese, Lichtenberg and Thurau.

Famous sites around Woltersdorf are the Brautstein ("stone of the bride") and the Feldkirche ("church on the field"). Both of them can be seen in the coat of arms of Woltersdorf. 
Former is a formation of ancient boulders left there by glaciers in the ice-age and has a legend to it, latter has a little stone in its walls which was taken from the Slavic population and was built into the church.  The stone shows a face that the Slavic population obviously prayed to. The Christians built it into their church to show their superiority.

References

Lüchow-Dannenberg